Max Keil Building may refer to the following buildings in Wilmington, Delaware:
Max Keil Building (700 N. Market Street)
Max Keil Building (712 N. Market Street)